Neoglyphidodon melas, also known as the bowtie damselfish, black damsel, bluefin or royal damsel, is a species of damselfish found in the Indo-West Pacific. It often makes its way into the aquarium trade.

Distribution and habitat
The black damselfish is found throughout the Indo-Pacific in coral reefs and lagoons. In the Indian Ocean, they are found around the Red Sea, the Persian Gulf, eastern Africa, Madagascar, Seychelles, the Arabian Sea, Sri Lanka, the Maldives, the Andaman Sea, Indonesia, and western Australia. In the Pacific Ocean, they are found in areas around Indonesia, Australia, the Philippines, Vietnam, Taiwan, Japan, Papua New Guinea, Palau, Vanuatu, and the Solomon Islands. they are found in depths of  under sea level.

Description
The coloration of the adults are blueish black. Juveniles are mostly pale blue with a yellow dorsal surface. They have blue pelvic and anal fins with black interior rays.

Ecology
Fish of this species are typically encountered individually or in pairs. Juveniles are encountered around Acropora corals. Adults are found around clams of the genus Tridacna and sometimes feed on their waste.

Diet
Neoglyphidodon melas is an omnivorous species of damselfish which feeds on a variety of things. Younger juveniles feed solely on plankton. Older juveniles of this species add soft corals to their diet. Young adults feed on Tridacna clam feces, with feces consumption increasing with age and size.

Behavior
Adults are territorial towards one another and will defend territorial borders. Large adults are observed to be aggressive to smaller individuals. The larger the individual, the more aggressive it gets. They are also known to attack larger fish than themselves.

In the aquarium
This species of fish is often found in the aquarium hobby. The average lifespan of this species in captivity is 2 to 3 years. As for most marine species, it is kept in a pH of 8.1 to 8.4, and a water hardness of 6° to 10°. Most people will keep this fish alone.

Breeding
Adults pair up when they are breeding. The eggs are laid in the substrate. Once the eggs are laid, the male guards and aerates the eggs until they hatch.

References

External links
 

melas
Fish described in 1830
Taxa named by Georges Cuvier